Capparis sprucei is a species of plant in the Capparaceae family. It is endemic to Peru.

References

sprucei
Endemic flora of Peru
Vulnerable plants
Taxonomy articles created by Polbot